Leonard Bingley Smith (September 5, 1915 – July 23, 2002) was an American cornet soloist, conductor, and composer.

Early life
Smith was born in Poughkeepsie, New York. He began to study cornet at the age of eight. After three years of study, he was sent to Ernest Williams, with whom he studied for 10 years.

Career 
Smith was the principal cornet soloist with the Goldman Band from 1936 to 1941. He was also the principal trumpet with The Detroit Symphony Orchestra from 1937 to 1942. He was the founder and conductor of the Detroit Concert Band from 1946 to 1991.

Discography
 Artist Awards Series - Leonard Smith Plays The Cornet (1960) [AAS-701]

Published works
Cornet/Trumpet Solos
 "Spanish Caprice" (1936) Charles Colin 
 "Ecstasy" (1938) Carl Fischer Inc.
 "Venture" (1962) First Division Publishing
 "Tall Men" (1968) Belwin Mills Publishing Corp.
 "Road Runner" (1973) Belwin Mills Publishing Corp.
 Valse "Au Printemps" (1973) Belwin Mills Publishing Corp.
 "Chamade" (1973) Belwin Mills Publishing Corp.
 "Nelda" (1973) Belwin Mills Publishing Corp.
 "The Three Troubadors" (Trumpet Trio) (1978) Belwin Mills Publishing Corp.
 "Apollo" (1980) Belwin Mills Publishing Corp.

References

External links
Leonard B. Smith - Library Of Congress
Discography of Historical American Recordings
Leonard B. Smith/Facebook

1915 births
2002 deaths
American cornetists
American bandleaders
20th-century classical musicians